Guillaume Burger (born 25 January 1989) is a French sprint canoer who has competed since the late 2000s.

Career
He won two medals at the 2009 ICF Canoe Sprint World Championships in Dartmouth with a silver in the K-4 1000 m and a bronze in the K-1 4 x 200 m events.

He is member of the CKCIR Saint Grégoire Club.

References

External links

1989 births
French male canoeists
Living people
ICF Canoe Sprint World Championships medalists in kayak
People from Schiltigheim
Mediterranean Games bronze medalists for France
Mediterranean Games medalists in canoeing
Competitors at the 2018 Mediterranean Games
European Games competitors for France
Canoeists at the 2019 European Games
Canoeists at the 2020 Summer Olympics
Olympic canoeists of France
Sportspeople from Bas-Rhin